Walter Packer (born November 7, 1955) is a former American football defensive back who played one season in the National Football League with the Tampa Bay Buccaneers and Seattle Seahawks. He was drafted by the Atlanta Falcons in the eighth round of the 1977 NFL Draft. He played college football at Mississippi State University, where he was a running back.

References

External links
Just Sports Stats
College stats

Living people
1955 births
Players of American football from Mississippi
American football defensive backs
American football running backs
African-American players of American football
Mississippi State Bulldogs football players
Tampa Bay Buccaneers players
Seattle Seahawks players
People from Leakesville, Mississippi
21st-century African-American people
20th-century African-American sportspeople